Preah Toung Neang Neak is a 2004 Khmer film. It stars Yuthara Chany, Meas Somavatei and Keo Pisey. The story is based on a Cambodian legend.

Cast
Yuthara Chany
Keo Pisey
Meas Somavatei

Soundtrack

Cambodian drama films
2004 films
2004 drama films